Penpont is a hamlet in the parish of St Breward, in north Cornwall, England, UK, in the Camel Valley.

There is also a place called Penpont near Wadebridge. The meaning of Penpont is "end of the bridge".

References

Hamlets in Cornwall